Love Uprising is the ninth album by the American soul/R&B group Tavares. It was produced by Benjamin Wright and released in 1980 on Capitol Records. Love Uprising at the time was Tavares' least successful album, their first to fail to register on either the pop or the R&B top 100.

Track listing 
 "Only One I Need to Love" (Jerry Taylor) - 3:12
 "Break Down for Love" (Benjamin Wright, Kathy Wakefield, Feliciano Tavares) - 4:39
 "Love Uprising" (Angela Winbush, René Moore) - 5:40
 "Loneliness" (Benjamin Wright, Lloyd Price) - 3:12
 "Knock the Wall Down" (Stephen Kipner) - 2:55
 "Hot Love" (Benjamin Wright, Kathy Wakefield, Feliciano Tavares) - 3:06
 "Don't Wanna Say Goodnight" (Keith Echols, Anthony Miller, Alice Sanderson) - 3:35
 "Do You Believe in Love" (Benjamin Wright, Kathy Wakefield, Feliciano Tavares, Perry Tavares) - 3:35
 "She Can Wait Forever" (Geoffrey Leib) - 3:36
 "In This Lovely World" (Jerry Taylor) - 3:45
 "Life Time of Love" (Geoffrey Leib) - 3:11

Singles 
 "Love Uprising" (US R&B #17)
 "Loneliness" (US R&B #64)

References

Tavares (group) albums
1980 albums
Capitol Records albums